McKelvey Valley is a valley between the western part of the Olympus Range and the Insel Range, in Victoria Land, Antarctica. It was named by the Victoria University of Wellington Antarctic Expedition (VUWAE) (1958–59) for B.C. McKelvey, a geologist of the Victoria University of Wellington, who, with P.N. Webb, undertook the first geological exploration of this area (1957–58), and was again in Wright Valley with the VUWAE in 1958–59.

References

Valleys of Victoria Land
McMurdo Dry Valleys